WRAP (Waste & Resources Action Programme) is a British registered charity. It works with businesses, individuals and communities to achieve a circular economy, by helping them reduce waste, develop sustainable products and use resources in an efficient way.

History
WRAP was established in 2000 as a company limited by guarantee and receives funding from the Department for Environment, Food and Rural Affairs, the Northern Ireland Executive, Zero Waste Scotland, the Welsh Government and the European Union.

Initiatives
WRAP developed the "Recycle Now", "Love Food, Hate Waste" and "Love your Clothes" initiatives. These aim to help businesses, local authorities, community groups and individuals recycle and reuse more, and reduce food waste.

Voluntary agreements 
Over recent years it has also brokered a number of voluntary agreements with business including:
The construction sector – with more than 700 companies succeeding in halving their waste to landfill by 2012
The retail sector – through the Courtauld Commitments, food and drink organisations are working together to reduce their burden on the environment.
The clothing industry – through the 'Sustainable Clothing Action Plan', working together to reduce the clothing industry footprint through sustainable design, reuse and recycling.

The Courtauld Commitment 
The Courtauld Commitments were initiated in 2005 at an event at the Courtauld Gallery in London.

Courtauld Commitment one
During 2005-2009 the Courtauld Commitment looked particularly at food packaging, and brought food waste onto the agenda.

Courtauld Commitment two
During 2010-2012 the Courtauld Commitment sought to go beyond reducing primary packaging to include secondary and tertiary packaging, and supply chain waste. It advanced from assessing packaging by weight to considering its carbon impact.

Third phase 
From 2013 to 2015, food and drink organisations worked together to reduce food, packaging and supply chain waste. Signatories to the Courtauld Commitment include industry leaders such as Tesco, Sainsbury's, Asda and big brands such as Unilever and Nestlé. The European Union praised phase one as an example of best practice. The phase three targets are:
Reduce household food and drink waste by 5% – this represents a 9% reduction in real terms to counter the expected increase in food purchased.
Reduce traditional grocery ingredient, product and packaging waste in the grocery supply chain by 3% – signatories will have to make an 8% reduction in real terms to counter the expected increase in production and sales.
Improve packaging design through the supply chain to maximise recycled content as appropriate, improve recyclability and deliver product protection to reduce food waste, while ensuring there is no increase in the carbon impact of packaging – signatories will have to make a 3% reduction in real terms to counter the expected sales increase.

Courtauld Commitment 2025
During 2015-2018, commitments sought to address the sustainability of food & drink production and consumption. The agreement looked at food waste, water and greenhouse gas emissions.

Courtauld Commitment 2030
As of 2023, the current phase of the agreement (Courtauld Commitment 2030), encourages collaborative action across the entire UK food chain aiming for reductions in greenhouse gas emissions, food waste and water stress.

Main business areas
These commitments fall within WRAP's four main business areas: food and drink waste reduction, sustainable electricals, sustainable textiles and resource management.

International
WRAP is extending its work internationally, having recently worked in partnership with the United Nations Environment Programme (UNEP) and the UN's Food and Agriculture Organization (FAO) to develop a global food waste guidance tool, part of the UNEP Think.Eat.Save initiative.

See also
Circular economy
Food waste in the United Kingdom
ICE demolition protocol
Publicly Available Specification
Quality Protocol

External links

References

British companies established in 2000
Department for Environment, Food and Rural Affairs
Food waste in the United Kingdom
Private companies limited by guarantee of the United Kingdom
Waste organizations
Waste management companies of the United Kingdom
2000 establishments in the United Kingdom
Business services companies established in 2000